The 2016 Alabama Democratic presidential primary took place on March 1 in the U.S. state of Alabama as one of the Democratic Party's primaries ahead of the 2016 presidential election.

On the same day, dubbed "Super Tuesday," Democratic primaries were held in ten other states plus American Samoa, while the Republican Party held primaries in eleven states including their own Alabama primary.

Opinion polling

Results

Primary date: March 1, 2016
National delegates: 60

Results by county

Analysis 
After losing Alabama badly to Barack Obama in 2008, Clinton bounced back eight years later to a 58-point routing against runner-up Bernie Sanders. Her landslide win in Alabama came from African Americans, who formed 54% of the Democratic electorate and backed Clinton over Sanders by a margin of 91–6. Clinton also won the white vote by a margin of 59–38.

Clinton carried every county in the state, but showed particular strength in the region in Central Alabama known as the Cotton Belt where the share of African American voters is highest, including the city of Birmingham. She also showed strength in and around the city of Mobile including Mobile Bay, along the Gulf Coast.

Clinton's Alabama victory was her second-highest in any state in the 2016 primary season.

After his landslide defeat, the Sanders campaign reported that Hillary Clinton had notched wins in southern states including Alabama because Bernie Sanders did not compete with her, although this claim was widely debunked since Sanders had opened more campaign offices in the state before the primary.

References

Alabama
Democratic primary
2016
March 2016 events in the United States